Oat sterile dwarf virus (OSDV) is a plant pathogenic virus of the family Reoviridae.

External links
ICTVdB - The Universal Virus Database: Oat sterile dwarf virus
Family Groups - The Baltimore Method

Viral plant pathogens and diseases
Fijiviruses